The Millennium University or TMU is a non governmental university located at Dhaka, Bangladesh. The university is sponsored by Khan Foundation, a Philanthropic Private Development Organisation (PVDO) and established under the Private University Act 1992. It is affiliated to the Government of Bangladesh and overseen by the University Grants Commission Bangladesh.

The main campus of TMU is situated at Momenbagh, Dhaka 1217, Bangladesh in the heart of the city. TMU is one of the few private universities in the country having its own campus under the charitable auspices of Khan Foundation. Such an arrangement contributes in saving rental and other overhead cost for TMU, thereby cutting down per capita education cost for students.

University admission is under UGC guidelines. Admission tests are conducted to select students on the basis of academic background, merit, and potential, through assessments and interactive sessions.

List of vice-chancellors 

 Prof. Dr. Abhinaya Chandra Saha (2016 - present)

Academics
TMU offers the following graduate and undergraduate programmes:
 Bachelor of Business Administration
 Master of Business Administration (Executive and Regular)
 B.Sc. in Information and Communication Technology
 M.Sc. in Information and Communication Technology
 B.Sc. in Computer Science and Engineering
 B.Pharm. in Pharmacy
 B.A. in English
 M.A. in English
 L.L.B. in Law
 L.L.M. in Law

External links
 MU at varsity admission

Footnotes

Private universities in Bangladesh
Educational institutions established in 2003
Universities and colleges in Dhaka
2003 establishments in Bangladesh